Parakaempferia is a genus of plants in the ginger family. It contains only one known species, Parakaempferia synantha, first described in 1971 and endemic to the Assam region of eastern India.

References

Flora of Assam (region)
Zingiberoideae
Zingiberaceae genera
Monotypic Zingiberales genera